Rawasari is an administrative village in the Cempaka Putih district, Central Jakarta, Jakarta, Indonesia. It has a postal code of 10570.

See also
 List of administrative villages of Jakarta

Administrative villages in Jakarta
Cempaka Putih